Papyrus 89 (in the Gregory-Aland numbering), designated by 𝔓89, is an early copy of the New Testament in Greek. It is a papyrus manuscript of the Epistle to the Hebrews. The surviving texts of Hebrews are verses 6:7–9,15–17.

The manuscript palaeographically has been assigned to the 4th century.
 Text
The Greek text of this codex is too brief for classification. Aland did not place it in any Category of New Testament manuscripts.
 Location
It is currently housed at the Biblioteca Medicea Laurenziana (PL III/292) in Florence.

See also 

 List of New Testament papyri

References

Further reading 
 

New Testament papyri
4th-century biblical manuscripts
Epistle to the Hebrews papyri